Recorder or The Recorder may refer to:

Newspapers
 Indianapolis Recorder, a weekly newspaper
 The Recorder (Massachusetts newspaper), a daily newspaper published in Greenfield, Massachusetts, US
 The Recorder (Port Pirie), a newspaper in Port Pirie, South Australia
 The Amsterdam Recorder, an American daily newspaper acquired by The Daily Gazette
 The Recorder, a Central Connecticut State University student newspaper
 The Recorder & Times,  a Canadian daily newspaper

Periodicals
 The Recorder, a rail transport periodical published by the Australian Railway Historical Society
 The Recorder, the journal of the American Irish Historical Society

Offices
 Recorder (Bible)
 Recorder (CSRT), the officer who assembled and presented evidence to Guantanamo Combatant Status Review Tribunals
 Recorder (judge), a part-time municipal judge, or the highest appointed legal officer of some local area
 Recorder, a clerk who records, or processes records
 Court recorder, or court reporter
 Recorder of deeds, a government office tasked with maintaining public records and documents

Other
 Recorder (musical instrument), a woodwind musical instrument in the flute family
 Recorder (comics), a fictional race of androids in some Marvel Comics
 Recorder: The Marion Stokes Project, a 2019 documentary about a video archivist

See also 
 
 Record (disambiguation)